Samuel Abraham Goudsmit (July 11, 1902 – December 4, 1978) was a Dutch-American physicist famous for jointly proposing the concept of electron spin with George Eugene Uhlenbeck in 1925.

Life and career
Goudsmit was born in The Hague, Netherlands, of Dutch Jewish descent. He was the son of Isaac Goudsmit, a manufacturer of water-closets, and Marianne Goudsmit-Gompers, who ran a millinery shop. In 1943, his parents were deported to a concentration camp by the German occupiers of the Netherlands and were murdered there.

Goudsmit studied physics at the University of Leiden under Paul Ehrenfest, where he obtained his PhD in 1927. After receiving his PhD, Goudsmit served as a Professor at the University of Michigan between 1927 and 1946. In 1930 he co-authored a text with Linus Pauling titled The Structure of Line Spectra.

During World War II he worked at the Massachusetts Institute of Technology. As scientific head of the Alsos Mission, he successfully reached a German group of nuclear physicists around Werner Heisenberg and Otto Hahn at Hechingen (then French zone) in advance of French physicist Yves Rocard, who had previously succeeded in recruiting German scientists to come to France.

Alsos, part of the Manhattan Project, was designed to assess the progress of the Nazi atomic bomb project. In the book Alsos, published in 1947, Goudsmit concludes that the Germans did not get close to creating a weapon. He attributed this to the inability of science to function under a totalitarian state and to Nazi scientists' lack of understanding of how to engineer an atomic bomb. Both of these conclusions have been disputed by later historians (see Heisenberg) and contradicted by the fact that the totalitarian Soviet state produced the bomb shortly after the book's release.

After the war he was briefly a professor at Northwestern University, and from 1948 to 1970 was a senior scientist at the Brookhaven National Laboratory, chairing the Physics Department 1952–1960. He meanwhile became well known as editor-in-chief of the leading physics journal Physical Review, published by the American Physical Society. In July 1958 he started the journal Physical Review Letters, which offers short notes with attendant brief delays. On his retirement as editor in 1974, Goudsmit moved to the faculty of the University of Nevada in Reno, where he remained until his death four years later.

He also made some scholarly contributions to Egyptology published in Expedition, Summer 1972, pp. 13–16 ; American Journal of Archaeology 78, 1974 p. 78; and Journal of Near Eastern Studies 40, 1981 pp. 43–46. The Samuel A. Goudsmit Collection of Egyptian Antiquities resides at the Kelsey Museum of Archaeology at the University of Michigan in Ann Arbor, Michigan.

Goudsmit became a corresponding member of the Royal Netherlands Academy of Arts and Sciences in 1939, though he resigned the next year. He was readmitted in 1950. He was elected to the United States National Academy of Sciences in 1947, the American Philosophical Society in 1952, American Academy of Arts and Sciences in 1964.

Marriages and children
Goudsmit married his first wife, Jaantje Logher, in 1927. They divorced in 1960, and in the same year Goudsmit married Irene Bejach. Like Goudsmit's parents, Irene's father, a German medical doctor and Berlin public health official, Curt Dietrich Bejach, had been murdered by the Nazis. He perished at the Auschwitz concentration camp.

Irene and her sister, Helga, left Germany for the United Kingdom as children shortly prior to the outbreak of World War II. They were evacuated as part of the Kindertransport programme, and lived for seven years in the Attenborough family home.

Goudsmit and his first wife had a daughter, Esther Marianne.

Works

References

External links

The Samuel A. Goudsmit Papers, the Niels Bohr Library & Archive, American Institute of Physics
Annotated Bibliography for Samuel Abraham Goudsmit from the Alsos Digital Library for Nuclear Issues
Goudsmit on the discovery of electron spin
 A collection of digitized materials related to Goudsmit's and Linus Pauling's structural chemistry research.
National Academy of Sciences Biographical Memoir

20th-century Dutch physicists
1902 births
1978 deaths
Manhattan Project people
Members of the Royal Netherlands Academy of Arts and Sciences
National Medal of Science laureates
Brookhaven National Laboratory staff
Leiden University alumni
University of Michigan faculty
Operation Alsos
American people of Dutch-Jewish descent
Dutch emigrants to the United States
Dutch Jews
Jewish American scientists
Winners of the Max Planck Medal
Jewish physicists
Scientists from The Hague
Scientists from Michigan
20th-century American physicists
20th-century American Jews
Fellows of the American Physical Society
Members of the American Philosophical Society